Yakamul, also known as Kap or Ali, is an Austronesian language spoken in East Aitape Rural LLG, Sandaun Province, Papua New Guinea.  It is spoken in the village of Yakamul on the north coast and on the islands of Ali, Angel, and Seleo islands.

References

Resources
 Klaffl, J., & Vormann, F. (1905). Die Sprachen des Berlinhafen-Bezirks in Deutsch-Neuguinea, Mitteilungen des Seminar für orientalische Sprachen zu Berlin, 8, 1-138.

Schouten languages
Languages of Sandaun Province